Kisha Snow (born February 25, 1969) is a female boxer from the United States.

In 1999, Snow won the amateur women's boxing American Heavyweight title. She has gone on to have a prosperous career as a professional boxer, fighting and beating some of the top female fighters.

Professional boxing record

References

American women boxers
1969 births
Living people
Heavyweight boxers
21st-century American women